Kismat Maria Mosque is an ancient mosque located at the village of Maria, Durgapur Upazila of Rajshahi District in Bangladesh. Built , the monument is listed by Department of Archaeology.  It is a small mosque of rectangular shape. There are three entrances to the mosque. There is a two-story small building by the mosque (to south) known as Bibir Ghor. The mosque is still used for Jumah prayer on Fridays.

See also
 List of mosques in Bangladesh
 List of archaeological sites in Bangladesh

References

Mosques in Bangladesh
Religious buildings and structures completed in 1500
Archaeological sites in Rajshahi District